Walter Tatenda Musona (born 12 December 1995) is a Zimbabwean footballer who plays as a forward for Polokwane City F.C. and the Zimbabwe national football team.

He has also been capped at the under-17, under-20 and under-23 levels.

Personal life
He is the youngest of six children, one of his older brothers being fellow Zimbabwe international Knowledge Musona. He is also Catholic.

References

External links

1995 births
Living people
Zimbabwean footballers
Zimbabwe international footballers
Zimbabwe under-20 international footballers
Zimbabwe youth international footballers
Association football forwards
F.C. Platinum players
Motor Action F.C. players
FK Senica players
Polokwane City F.C. players
Slovak Super Liga players
South African Premier Division players
Zimbabwean Christians
People from Norton, Zimbabwe